Dorset & Wilts 3 South was an English Rugby Union league, forming part of the South West Division, primarily for clubs based in Dorset, sitting at tier 10 of the English rugby union system.  Promoted teams generally moved up to Dorset & Wilts 2 South.  Relegated teams dropped to Dorset & Wilts 4 until the cancellation of this division at the end of the 2015–16 season; after that there was no relegation. The league was created in 2005 and disbanded after the 2018–19 season.

History 
Until 2005, Dorset & Wilts 3 was one division with teams from Berkshire included.  In that year, three regional divisions were created for teams in Dorset and Wiltshire, namely Dorset & Wilts 3 North, Dorset & Wilts 3 South and Dorset & Wilts 3 West. The West division was disbanded at the end of the 2008–09 season, leaving just the North and South divisions.  At the end of the 2018–19 season Dorset & Wilts 3 South was cancelled.

On occasion, clubs in this division also took part in the RFU Junior Vase, a level 9–12 national competition.

2019–20

2018–19

2017–18

2016–17
Blandford II
Bournemouth V
Dinton
Ellingham & Ringwood III
Fordingbridge II (relegated from Dorset & Wilts 2 South)
New Milton III
Oakmedians III
Poole (relegated from Dorset & Wilts 2 South)
Salisbury IV
Swanage & Wareham III
Weymouth & Portland II
Wimborne III

2015–16
The division consisted of ten teams, seven in Dorset, two in Wiltshire and one in Hampshire.

Seven of the teams participated in last season's competition. The 2014–15 champions, Wheatsheaf Cabin Crew were promoted to Dorset & Wilts 2 South along with Poole (2nd) and Fordingbridge II (3rd), while Weymouth & Portland II and Blandford II were relegated to Dorset & Wilts 4.

2012–13
Frome III
Lytchett Minster
Oakmeadians III	
Salisbury III
South Wilts
Swanage & W III
Verwood
Wheatsheaf Cabin Crew
Wimborne III
Wincanton

Original teams
When this division was introduced in 1992 it was a single division known as Berks/Dorset/Wilts 3, containing the following teams from Dorset and Wiltshire:

Amesbury – transferred from Berks/Dorset/Wilts 3 East (4th)
Colerne – transferred from Berks/Dorset/Wilts 3 East (5th)
Plessey Christ – transferred from Berks/Dorset/Wilts 3 West (6th)
Portcastrians – transferred from Berks/Dorset/Wilts 3 West (7th)
Poole – transferred from Berks/Dorset/Wilts 3 West (5th)
Westbury – transferred from Berks/Dorset/Wilts 3 West (4th)

Dorset & Wilts 3 South honours

Berks/Dorset/Wilts 3 (1992–1993)

Originally Dorset & Wilts 3 North and Dorset & Wilts 3 South were combined in a single division known as Berks/Dorset/Wilts 3.  Berks/Dorset/Wilts 3 itself was created ahead of the 1992–93 season by merging the existing Berks/Dorset/Wilts 3 East and Berks/Dorset/Wilts 3 West divisions.  It was a tier 10 league with promotion to Berks/Dorset/Wilts 2 and there was no relegation.

Berks/Dorset/Wilts 3 (1993–1996)

The creation of National League 5 South for the 1993–94 season meant that Berks/Dorset/Wilts 3 dropped to become a tier 11 league.  Promotion continued to  Berks/Dorset/Wilts 2 and there was no relegation.

Berks/Dorset/Wilts 3 (1996–2000)

The cancellation of National League 5 South at the end of the 1995–96 season meant that Berks/Dorset/Wilts 3 reverted to being a tier 10 league.  Promotion continued to Berks/Dorset/Wilts 2 and there was no relegation.  At the end of the 1999–00 season the division was cancelled and all teams transferred into the new look Dorset & Wilts 2 North or Dorset & Wilts 2 South

Dorset & Wilts 3 South (2005–2009)

After an absence of four years, Berks/Dorset/Wilts 3 was reintroduced in the form of two tier 10 regional divisions – Dorset & Wilts 3 North and Dorset & Wilts 3 South.  Promotion was to Dorset & Wilts 2 South and there was no relegation.

Dorset & Wilts 3 South (2009–present)

Despite widespread restructuring by the RFU at the end of the 2008–09 season, Dorset & Wilts 3 South remained a tier 10 league, with promotion continuing to Dorset & Wilts 2 South and, between 2011 and 2016, relegation was to the since discontinued Dorset & Wilts 4.  Dorset & Wilts 3 South was itself cancelled at the end of the 2018–19 season.

Number of league titles

East Dorset (2)
New Milton III (2)
North Dorset III (2)
Berkshire Shire Hall (1)
Bournemouth III (1)
Bradford-on-Avon (1)
Bridport II (1)
Dorset Police (1)
Dorchester II (1)
Dorset Dockers II (1)
Fordingbridge II (1)
Hungerford (1)
Lytchett Minster (1)
Minety (1)
Poole (1)
Puddletown (1)
Swanage & Wareham IV (1)
Wheatsheaf Cabin Crew (1)
Wincanton (1)

Notes

See also 
 South West Division RFU
 Dorset & Wilts RFU
 English rugby union system
 Rugby union in England

References 

Defunct rugby union leagues in England
Rugby union in Dorset
Rugby union in Wiltshire